The Canadian order of precedence is a nominal and symbolic hierarchy of important positions within the governing institutions of Canada. It has no legal standing, but is used to dictate ceremonial protocol.

The Department of Canadian Heritage issues a Table of Precedence for Canada, which does not include members of the royal family, save for the sovereign, mentioned in a note as preceding the governor general. The Department of National Defence issues near-identical guidelines, with the primary difference being the inclusion of members of the Canadian Royal Family, specifying that they take precedence after the governor general. The provinces and territories of Canada also have their own orders of precedence for events of a provincial or territorial nature. They serve the same purpose and are structured similarly, but place an emphasis on provincial or territorial offices.

All units of the Canadian Armed Forces also have an order of precedence that determines seniority; it often decides such matters as which unit forms up to the right (senior side) of other units on a ceremonial parade, or the order in which marches or calls are played at a mess dinner.

 King of Canada
 Governor General of Canada (Mary Simon)
 Prime Minister of Canada
 Chief Justice of Canada
 Former Governors General of Canada in order of their departure from office:
 Ed Schreyer (1979–1984)
 Adrienne Clarkson (1999–2005)
 Michaëlle Jean (2005–2010)
 David Johnston (2010–2017)
 Julie Payette (2017–2021)
 Widows of Governors General of Canada (as former viceregal consort of Canada):
 Gerda Hnatyshyn, widow of Ray Hnatyshyn
 Diana Fowler LeBlanc, widow of Roméo LeBlanc
 Former Prime Ministers of Canada in order of their first assumption of office:
 Joe Clark (1979–1980)
 Brian Mulroney (1984–1993)
 Kim Campbell (1993)
 Jean Chrétien (1993–2003)
 Paul Martin (2003–2006)
 Stephen Harper (2006–2015)
 Former Chief Justices of Canada, in order of their appointment
 Beverly McLachlin (2000–2017)
 Speaker of the Senate of Canada
 Speaker of the House of Commons of Canada
 Representatives to Canada of foreign governments
 Ambassadors and High Commissioners come first, in order of the presentation of their credentials; then come Ministers Plenipotentiary, and then Chargés d'affaires.
 Members of the Canadian Ministry
 Members of the Cabinet:
 The Table of Precedence for Canada prescribes that order of precedence within this group be determined in order of appointment to the King's Privy Council for Canada with ties broken by order of election to the House or appointment to the Senate. However, the current Canadian Ministry opted to use an alternative order that is determined by the Prime Minister.
Ministers of State
In order of appointment to the King's Privy Council for Canada with ties broken by order of election to the House or appointment to the Senate.
 Leader of His Majesty's Loyal Opposition (Pierre Poilievre)
 Lieutenant Governors of the provinces, in the order their province joined Confederation and by population at joining to break ties
 Lieutenant Governor of Ontario
 Lieutenant Governor of Quebec
 Lieutenant Governor of Nova Scotia
 Lieutenant Governor of New Brunswick
 Lieutenant Governor of Manitoba
 Lieutenant Governor of British Columbia
 Lieutenant Governor of Prince Edward Island
 Lieutenant Governor of Saskatchewan
 Lieutenant Governor of Alberta
 Lieutenant Governor of Newfoundland and Labrador
 All other Members of the King's Privy Council for Canada in order with the date of their appointment to the Privy Council, but with precedence given to those who bear the title "Right Honourable" in accordance with the date of receiving the honorary title.
 List of current members of the King's Privy Council for Canada
 Premiers of the provinces, in the order their province joined confederation and by population at joining to break ties
 Premier of Ontario
 Premier of Quebec
 Premier of Nova Scotia
 Premier of New Brunswick
 Premier of Manitoba
 Premier of British Columbia
 Premier of Prince Edward Island
 Premier of Saskatchewan
 Premier of Alberta
 Premier of Newfoundland and Labrador
 Commissioners of the Territories
 Commissioner of the Northwest Territories
 Commissioner of Yukon
 Commissioner of Nunavut
 Premiers of the Territories
 Premier of the Northwest Territories
 Premier of Yukon
 Premier of Nunavut
 Religious leaders, equally, by seniority
Limited to "senior Canadian representatives of faith communities having a significant presence in a relevant jurisdiction".
 Puisne Judges of the Supreme Court
 Superior court justices
 Chief Justice of the Federal Court of Canada
 Associate Chief Justice of the Federal Court of Canada
 Chief Justices of the highest court of each province and territory in order of date of appointment as chief justice
 Chief Justice of Ontario
 Chief Justice of Quebec
 Chief Justice of Nova Scotia
 Chief Justice of New Brunswick
 Chief Justice of Manitoba
 Chief Justice of British Columbia and Yukon
 Chief Justice of Prince Edward Island
 Chief Justice of Saskatchewan
 Chief Justice of Alberta, the Northwest Territories, and Nunavut
 Chief Justice of Newfoundland and Labrador
 Chief Justices and Associate Chief Justices of other superior courts, in order of appointment as chief justice
 Associate Chief Justice of Ontario
 Chief Justice of the Ontario Superior Court of Justice
 Associate Chief Justice of the Ontario Superior Court of Justice
 Chief Justice of the Superior Court of Quebec
 Senior Associate Chief Justice of the Superior Court of Quebec
 Associate Chief Justice of the Superior Court of Quebec
 Chief Justice of the Supreme Court of Nova Scotia
 Associate Chief Justice of the Supreme Court of Nova Scotia
 Associate Chief Justice of the Supreme Court of Nova Scotia, Family Division
 Chief Justice of the Court of King's Bench of New Brunswick
 Chief Justice of the Court of King's Bench of Manitoba
 Associate Chief Justice of the Court of King's Bench of Manitoba
 Associate Chief Justice, Family Division, of the Court of King's Bench of Manitoba
 Chief Justice of the Supreme Court of British Columbia
 Associate Chief Justice of the Supreme Court of British Columbia
 Chief Justice of the Trial Division, Supreme Court of Prince Edward Island
 Chief Justice of the Court of King's Bench for Saskatchewan
 Chief Justice of the Court of King's Bench of Alberta
 Associate Chief Justice of the Court of King's Bench of Alberta
 Chief Justice of the Trial Division of the Supreme Court of Newfoundland
 Senior Judge of the Supreme Court of the Northwest Territories
 Senior Judge of the Supreme Court of the Yukon Territory
 Senior Judge of the Nunavut Court of Justice
 Federal and provincial superior court puisne justices
 Senators
 See List of current Canadian senators
 Members of the House of Commons
 See List of House members of the 44rd Parliament of Canada
 Consuls General of Countries Without Diplomatic Representation
 Clerk of the Privy Council and Secretary to Cabinet
 Chief of the Defence Staff (Wayne Eyre)
 Commissioner of the Royal Canadian Mounted Police (Brenda Lucki)
 Speakers of the Legislative Assemblies of the Provinces and Territories
 Speaker of the Legislative Assembly of Ontario
 President of the National Assembly of Quebec
 Speaker of the Nova Scotia House of Assembly (Keith Bain)
 Speaker of the Legislative Assembly of New Brunswick
 Speaker of the Legislative Assembly of Manitoba
 Speaker of the Legislative Assembly of British Columbia
 Speaker of the Legislative Assembly of Prince Edward Island
 Speaker of the Legislative Assembly of Saskatchewan
 Speaker of the Legislative Assembly of Alberta
 Speaker of the Newfoundland and Labrador House of Assembly (Derek Bennett)
 Speaker of the Legislative Assembly of the Northwest Territories
 Speaker of the Yukon Legislative Assembly (Jeremy Harper)
 Speaker of the Legislative Assembly of Nunavut (Tony Akoak)
 Members of the Executive Councils of the Provinces and Territories
 Judges of Provincial and Territorial Courts
 Members of the Legislative Assemblies of the Provinces and Territories
 Chairperson of the Canadian Association of Former Parliamentarians

See also
 Canadian order of precedence (decorations and medals)
 Canadian Forces order of precedence
 Politics of Canada
 Removal from the Order of Canada

Footnotes

External links
Department of Canadian Heritage: Table of Precedence for Canada
The Honours, Flags and Heritage Structure of the Canadian Forces

Order of precedence, Canadian